Claude James Rothgeb (January 1, 1880 – July 5, 1944) was an American football, basketball, and baseball player and coach. He served as the head football coach at the Agricultural College of Colorado, now Colorado State University, from 1906 to 1909, at Colorado College from 1910 to 1918, and at Rice University in 1928, compiling a career college football record of 47–36–3. Rothgeb played football and basketball and ran track at the University of Illinois at Urbana–Champaign, from which he graduated in 1905. He played for Major League Baseball's Washington Senators in 1905.

Rothgeb died at Voss' Birchwood Lodge in Manitowish Waters, Wisconsin.

Head coaching record

Football

References

External links

1880 births
1944 deaths
American football ends
Major League Baseball right fielders
Colorado College Tigers football coaches
Colorado College Tigers men's basketball coaches
Colorado State Rams athletic directors
Colorado State Rams baseball coaches
Colorado State Rams football coaches
Colorado State Rams men's basketball coaches
Illinois Fighting Illini baseball players
Illinois Fighting Illini football coaches
Illinois Fighting Illini football players
Rice Owls football coaches
Texas A&M Aggies baseball coaches
Texas A&M Aggies football coaches
Baltimore Orioles (IL) players
Indianapolis Indians players
Troy Trojans (minor league) players
Washington Senators (1901–1960) players
College men's track and field athletes in the United States
People from Milford, Illinois
Coaches of American football from Illinois
Players of American football from Illinois
Basketball coaches from Illinois
Baseball players from Illinois